Khao Yai, meaning 'large mountain' in Thai, usually refers to an area in the Sankamphaeng mountain range of Thailand which is now Khao Yai National Park.

Khao Yai may also refer to:
Khao Yai, the area adjoining the national park in Pak Chong District, Nakhon Ratchasima Province
Khao Yai District, a former name of Pak Phli District, Nakhon Nayok Province
 Khao Yai Subdistrict in Ao Luek District, Krabi Province
 Khao Yai Subdistrict in Cha-am District, Phetchaburi Province
 Khao Yai is a name shared by several mountains in the Tenasserim Hills
 Khao Yai, Ratchaburi, a-1,050-m high mountain in Ratchaburi Province
 Khao Yai, Sangkhla Buri, an 805-m-high mountain in Sangkhla Buri District, Kanchanaburi Province
 Khao Yai, Thong Pha Phum, a 1,025-m-high mountain in Thong Pha Phum District, Kanchanaburi Province
 Khao Yai, Thap Sakae, a 919-m-high mountain in Thap Sakae District, Prachuap Khiri Khan Province